Lina Svarinska (born 15 March 2001) is a Latvian professional racing cyclist, who currently rides for UCI Women's Continental Team . In August 2020, she rode in the 2020 Strade Bianche Women's race in Italy.

References

External links
 

2001 births
Living people
Latvian female cyclists
Place of birth missing (living people)